The Belum Caves, located in Nandyala district of Andhra Pradesh's Rayalaseema region, is the second largest cave system on the Indian subcontinent, known for its speleothems, such as stalactite and stalagmite formations. The Belum Caves have long passages, galleries, spacious caverns with fresh water and siphons. This cave system was formed over the course of tens of thousands of years by the constant flow of underground water from the now-disappeared river Chitravathi. The cave system reaches its deepest point ( from entrance level) at the point known as Pataalaganga. It is one of the centrally protected Monuments of National Importance.

Belum came to scientific attention in 1884 by a British surveyor, Robert Bruce Foote and from 1982 to 1984, a team of German speleologists headed by H. Daniel Gebauer conducted a detailed exploration of the caves. In 1988, the state government declared the site protected, and Andhra Pradesh Tourism Development Corporation (APTDC) developed the caves as a tourist attraction in February 2002. Today,  of the caves have been successfully explored, though only  is accessible to visitors. There are 16 different pathways, including the main entrance and there are deposits of quartz in the caves. The caves consist of black limestone.

The site 
The Belum Caves are located near Belum Village in Kolimigundla mandal of Nandyal district (earlier in Kurnool district) in the state of Andhra Pradesh. The caves are an  drive from Petnikota village.

Belum is part of a larger complex of caves carved out of the limestone deposits in the Erramalai region. Other caves include the Billasurgam caves, Sanyasula caves, Yaganti caves, Yerrajari caves, and the Muchchatla Chintamanu caves (caves are called gavi in the local language).

Discovery 
Even though the Belum Caves were known to local people, the first records of site come from the expedition report of British geologist and archaeologist Robert Bruce Foote, in 1884.  Thereafter, the Belum Caves remained unnoticed for almost a century until a German team headed by Herbert Daniel Gebauer conducted detailed exploration of the caves in 1982 and 1983. The German expedition was assisted by Mr Bacham Chalapathi Reddy (retd. Deputy superintendent of police), Mr Pothireddy Rama Subba Reddy (retd. Headmaster), Mr Ramaswami Reddy, Mr Boyu Madduleti, Mr K. Padmanabhaiah, Mr K. Chinnaiah and Mr A. Sunkanna.
 4,500 BC remnants of vessels of that age were found in the caves.
 Occupied by Jain and Buddhist monks, over two thousands years ago
 1884 existence of the caves recorded by the British geologist and archaeologist Mr Robert Bruce Foote.
 1982 explored by the German Herbert Daniel Gebauer.
 1983 explored by the German Herbert Daniel Gebauer.
 1988 declared protected by the Government of Andhra Pradesh.
 1999 development of the cave by Andhra Pradesh Tourism Development Corporation started.
 FEB-2002 cave opened to the public.
 JUL-2002 Musical chamber discovered.
 JAN 2013 A new cavernicolous (inhabiting caves) Isopod species discovered, named Andhracoides gebaueri

Historical importance 
Belum Caves are geologically and historically important caves.  There are indications that Jains and Buddhists monks occupied these caves centuries ago.  Many Buddhists relics were found inside the caves.  These relics are now housed in Museum at Ananthapur.

Archaeological survey of India (ASI) also found remnants of vessels of the pre-Buddhist era and dated the remnants of these objects to 4500 years BCE.

Biological importance 

A new and second Indian cavernicolous (inhabiting caves) species of the genus Andhracoides was discovered in the Pataalaganga chamber. The organism is named Andhracoides gebaueri in honor of Herbert Daniel Gebauer who documented and mapped the complete cave

Development 
The caves were being used to dump wastes from nearby places until 1988. Local people of nearby settlements, notably Policemen and residents of Belum Village co-operated with the Government of Andhra Pradesh and developed the cave site as a tourist attraction. Finally, their almost two-decade long efforts resulted in the Government of Andhra Pradesh declaring the entire area to be a protected zone. Finally, in 1999, the Andhra Pradesh Tourism Development Corporation took over the task of beautifying and maintaining the caves. The APTDC who has since been in charge of management, sanctioned Rs. 7.5 million to develop the caves. The APTDC has also developed the pathways of around  length in and outside of the caves, provided illumination and has created fresh-air-shafts at the site. Inside the cave, APTDC has installed bridges and staircases, and a canteen, bathrooms and toilet facilities at the entry point. APTDC also has built a Haritha Hotel for accommodation in the vicinity.

There is a sizeable Buddha statue near on a hillock near the caves. One of the caverns at Belum is known as the "Meditation Hall", which was used by Buddhist monks. Relics of the Buddhist period were found here. These relics are now housed in a museum in Ananthapur.

Entry 

Indian tourists are charged an amount of Rs. 65 for entry, while foreign tourists are charged Rs. 300. At the entrance, there is an electronic cave gate. A metal staircase leads down into the cave.

The entrance pit was originally smaller than what one sees today. It was broadened to fit the staircase, to allow visitors to descend and ascend easily.

The entrance is like that of a Pit Cave. From the ground you can only see two pits side by side and a third pit a little further away. After descending around 20 meters by the stairs from the entrance, the caves become horizontal. The first section one enters is called the Gebauer Hall, named after the speleologist, H. Daniel Gebauer, who had explored and mapped the caves in 1982-1983. The path to Gebauer Hall leads to the second opening, which lies next to the main entrance.

Main Sections of Belum Caves 

 Simhadwaram – simhadwaram means lion's gate.  It is a natural arch of stalactites formed in the shape of a lion's head;
 Kotilingalu Chamber – This section contains stalactite formations which are akin to Shiva lingams.  This section has thousands of such stalactite giving it a surrealistic look.  It has one huge pillar formed due to stalactite and stalagmite joining together.
 Patalaganga – It is a small perennial stream which disappears into the depths of the earth. This stream flows from the southeast to northwest.  It disappears and is believed to be heading towards a well at the Belum village, located 2 km away from the caves.
 Saptasvarala Guha or Musical Chamber – Saptasvarala Guha means chamber of seven notes.  The stalactite formations in this chamber reproduce musical sounds when these are struck with a wooden stick or knuckles.  This section was opened to the public in 2006.
 Dhyan Mandir or Meditation Hall – This section is near to the entrance.  An interesting formation at Meditation hall looks like a bed with pillow to recline.  The local legend has it that in ancient times many sages used to live here.  This section was used by Buddhist Monks. Many relics of Buddhist period were found here which are now housed in museum at Ananthapur.
 Thousand Hoods – This section has amazing stalactite formations shaped like hood of Cobra.  The stalactite formations on the ceiling looks as if thousands of cobras have opened their hoods.
 Banyan Tree Hall – This section has a huge pillar with stalactites hanging from the ceiling. This gives a look of Banyan Tree with its aerial roots when seen from below.  The locals call it "Voodalamari" since it looks like a Banyan Tree with its aerial roots hanging from the branches.
 Mandapam – This is a huge area inside the cave with magnificent stalactite structures on the sides giving it a look of a hall with pillars.

Awards to APTDC for Belum Caves 
  In, 2003, APTDC won the prestigious "National Tourism Awards" instituted by Ministry of Tourism and Culture, Government of India, for its initiatives in developing and promoting Belum Caves.
  Belum caves was also adjudged the best destination award 2002 at the Tourism and Travel Fair held in Bangalore in 2002.

Access 
There are daily or weekly trains from Delhi, Mumbai, Chennai, Hyderabad, Tirupati, Kanyakumari, Thiruvananthapuram, Coimbatore and Goa which halt at Tadipatri railway station. From Tadipatri, one can take a bus to the Belum Caves. Frequently available buses, which ply between Tadipatri and Banaganapalli of Nandyala district, drop you at Belum caves.

Gallery

See also 
 List of India cave temples
 Cave research in India

References

Further reading 

 A new species of Andhracoides Wilson and Ranga Reddy, 2011 (Isopoda: Hypsimetopidae) from Belum Cave, Andhra Pradesh, India, with a phylogenetic review of the family by George D. F. Wilson, Shabuddin Shaik and Yenumula Ranga Reddy Source: Journal of Crustacean Biology, Volume 35, Issue 2, pages 216 – 240 Publication Year : 2015, DOI: 10.1163/1937240X-00002333, E-ISSN 1937-240X, Document Type: Research Article. http://booksandjournals.brillonline.com/content/journals/10.1163/1937240x-00002333

External links 

 www.BelumCaves.com  Website
 Deccan Herald - Underground adventure in Belum caves
 The Telegraph - Calcutta : Weekend
 cave-biology.org Cave biology (biospeleology) in India.

Caves of Andhra Pradesh
Show caves in India
Buildings and structures in Kurnool district
Archaeological sites in Andhra Pradesh
Buddhist caves in India
Indian rock-cut architecture
Caves containing pictograms in India
Buddhist sites in Andhra Pradesh
Jain rock-cut architecture
Geography of Kurnool district